Jasmin Darznik is the author of three books, The Bohemians (April 6, 2021), Song of a Captive Bird, a novel inspired by the life of Forugh Farrokhzad, Iran's notorious woman poet, and The Good Daughter: A Memoir of My Mother's Hidden Life, which became a New York Times bestseller. A New York Times Book Review "Editors' Choice" and a Los Angeles Times bestseller, Song of a Captive Bird was praised by The New York Times as a "complex and beautiful rendering of [a] vanished country and its scattered people; a reminder of the power and purpose of art; and an ode to female creativity under a patriarchy that repeatedly tries to snuff it out." The Bohemians was selected by Oprah Daily as one of the best historical novels of 2021. Darznik's books have been published in seventeen countries.

Biography
Darznik was born in Iran and came to the United States at the age of five. She graduated summa cum laude with a BA from the University of California Los Angeles in 1994 and a JD from the University of California, Hastings College of the Law in 1997. She later received a PhD in English literature from Princeton University in 2008 and an MFA from Bennington College in 2014.

Her first book, The Good Daughter: A Memoir of My Mother's Hidden Life was described by Kirkus reviews as "an eye-opening account that disturbs with its depiction of the place of women in Iranian society, but warms the heart in its portrayal of their gritty endurance."

Her other two books are works of biographical fiction. Song of a Captive Bird (2018) is a fictional account about the trailblazing Iranian poet, Forugh Farrokhzad and The Bohemians (2021) imagines the life of a young Dorothea Lange in 1920s San Francisco.

She is now a professor of in the MFA and Writing and Literature programs at California College of the Arts in San Francisco. She previously taught at Princeton University, Washington and Lee University, the University of Virginia, and the University of San Francisco.

Awards
Darznik is a recipient of a 2012 fellowship from the Virginia Foundation for the Humanities and an Outstanding Faculty Award from the State Council of Higher Education for Virginia. She has received fellowships from the Steinbeck Fellows Program, The Bennington Writers Seminars, and the Corporation of Yaddo. Her work has also been nominated for a Pushcart Prize. Song of a Captive Bird won the Writer's Center first novel prize and was long-listed for the 2018 Center for Fiction First Novel Prize. Her first book, The Good Daughter, was a finalist for the Library of Virginia's 2012 People's Choice Award and was shortlisted for the William Saroyan International Prize in Creative Nonfiction.

Bibliography
 The Bohemians. Penguin Random House. April 6, 2021. ISBN 978-0593129425
 Song of a Captive Bird. Penguin Random House. February 2018. 
The Good Daughter: A Memoir of My Mother's Hidden Life. Grand Central Publishing. February 2011.

References

External links
 Official Website
 Random House Author Page
 Faculty webpage at the California College of the Arts

Living people
1973 births
21st-century American women writers
American writers of Iranian descent
Iranian emigrants to the United States
Bennington College alumni
Princeton University alumni
University of California, Los Angeles alumni
University of California, Hastings College of the Law alumni
California College of the Arts faculty
Princeton University faculty
University of San Francisco faculty
University of Virginia faculty
Washington and Lee University faculty